Sybra baculina is a species of beetle in the family Cerambycidae. It was described by Henry Walter Bates in 1866. It contains seven subspecies: S. baculina baculina, S. baculina mimogeminata, S. baculina miyakoana, S. baculina musashinoi, S. baculina nipponensis, S. baculina omoro, and S. baculina oshimana.

References

baculina
Beetles described in 1866